Carlos DeShaun Hall (born January 16, 1979) is a former American football defensive end in the National Football League (NFL). He was drafted by the Tennessee Titans in the seventh round of the 2002 NFL Draft. He also played for the Kansas City Chiefs and Denver Broncos. He played college football at Arkansas.

College career
Hall started 32 of 41 career games at the University of Arkansas, where he was named honorable mention All-American by Street & Smith and second-team All-SEC by the Associated Press as senior, recording 49 tackles, five tackles for loss, two forced fumbles, one fumble recovery and one sack.

Personal life
His son Keiondre Hall is a defensive end at  Pittsburg State University.

References

1979 births
Living people
People from Marianna, Arkansas
Players of American football from Arkansas
American football defensive ends
Arkansas Razorbacks football players
Tennessee Titans players
Kansas City Chiefs players
Denver Broncos players